Yes, We're Open is a 2012 American independent film directed by Richard Wong and written by H.P. Mendoza, the first collaboration between Wong and Mendoza since their 2006 debut film, Colma: The Musical. The film premiered March 11, 2012 at the San Francisco International Asian American Film Festival. After a year of touring the film festival circuit and winning Best Screenplay at the Los Angeles Asian Pacific Film Festival, Yes, We're Open was released on home video on October 12, 2012.

Plot

Luke and Sylvia think of themselves as the embodiment of a "modern" couple – always in the know, open to new experiences, and proud to be San Franciscans. Enter Elena and Ronald – a provocative polyamorous couple that not only challenge Luke and Sylvia's status amongst their friends, but also force them to examine their commitment to each other. With temptation right around the corner, Luke and Sylvia must figure out where they really stand on love, sex, and honesty.

Cast

 Lynn Chen as Silvia
 Parry Shen as Luke
 Sheetal Sheth as Elena
 Kerry McCrohan as Ronald
 Theresa Navarro as Cassie
 Tasi Alabastro as Scott
 H.P. Mendoza as Brent

Awards and nominations
 Centerpiece - San Francisco International Asian American Film Festival
 Best Screenplay - Los Angeles Asian Pacific Film Festival

Reception
Dennis Harvey of Variety gave the film a favorable review, calling it a "satirical dart aimed at the conflict between trendy mores vs. personal limits", while Ben Sachs of the Chicago Reader gave the film a mixed review saying "the acting can be downright amateurish".

See also
 Colma: The Musical (2006), film directed by Richard Wong
 Fruit Fly (2009), film directed by H.P. Mendoza

References

External links
 

2012 romantic comedy films
2012 films
American romantic comedy films
Polyamory in fiction
2010s English-language films
2010s American films